Asylum is a British comedy series which is shown on BBC Four from 9 to 23 February 2015. The satirical comedy series revolves around a whistleblower and an internet pirate find themselves trapped together under the threat of extradition in the London embassy of a fictional Latin American country. 
The show was inspired by Julian Assange’s two-year stay in the Ecuadorian embassy and the controversial entrepreneur Kim Dotcom.
The show was initially conceived by fonejacker star, Kayvan Novak and Tom Thostrup, before being written by Thom Phipps and Peter Bowden.

Controversy

One of the writers of the series Thom Phipps once called for the police to publicly shoot the Wikileaks founder in the head. On the day Julian Assange was given political asylum, by the government of Ecuador, Phipps tweeted: 'If the met [police] want to regain my trust they should drag Assange out the embassy + shoot him in the back of th head in the middle of traf square.' A complaint was lodged with the BBC over its decision to employ Phipps on the basis that he 'advocated for the public extrajudicial assassination' of the Wikileaks founder. The BBC's response was that: 'Unfortunately Mr Philip's [sic] is not a BBC member of staff and is not representing the BBC. Therefore we will not be commenting on Twitter posts made by third parties.' 

The series has yet to be released on DVD.

Cast and crew
Written by Thom Phipps and Peter Bowden

Principal cast and characters
 Ben Miller as Dan Hern
 Kayvan Novak as Rafael
 Niky Wardley as Lorna
 Yasmine Akram as Rosa
 Dustin Demri-Burns as Ludo Backslash
 John Guerrasio as Mo
 Darrell D'Silva as Castillo
 David Cross as Juan Pablo
 Ayo Mary Laurent as Mary

Episodes

References

External links 
 
 

2010s British satirical television series
2010s British television miniseries
2015 British television series debuts
2015 British television series endings
BBC television comedy
English-language television shows
Cultural depictions of Julian Assange
Kim Dotcom
Television shows set in London